Imamia Colony railway station is located in Imamia Colony Ferozewala, Sheikhupura District, Pakistan.

See also
 List of railway stations in Pakistan
 Pakistan Railways

References

External links

Railway stations in Punjab, Pakistan